In Greek mythology, Nireus (Ancient Greek: Νιρεύς) may refer to the following personages:

 Nireus, a Thessalian princes as the son of Poseidon and princess Canace, daughter of King Aeolus of Aeolia. He was the brother of Hopleus, Epopeus, Aloeus and Triops.
Nireus, king of Syme
 Nireus, a companion of Heracles.

Notes

References 

 Apollodorus, The Library with an English Translation by Sir James George Frazer, F.B.A., F.R.S. in 2 Volumes, Cambridge, MA, Harvard University Press; London, William Heinemann Ltd. 1921. ISBN 0-674-99135-4. Online version at the Perseus Digital Library. Greek text available from the same website.
Diodorus Siculus, The Library of History translated by Charles Henry Oldfather. Twelve volumes. Loeb Classical Library. Cambridge, Massachusetts: Harvard University Press; London: William Heinemann, Ltd. 1989. Vol. 3. Books 4.59–8. Online version at Bill Thayer's Web Site
 Diodorus Siculus, Bibliotheca Historica. Vol 1-2. Immanel Bekker. Ludwig Dindorf. Friedrich Vogel. in aedibus B. G. Teubneri. Leipzig. 1888-1890. Greek text available at the Perseus Digital Library.

Thessalian characters in Greek mythology